Classical Antiquity is a period in the history of the Near East and Mediterranean, extending roughly from the 8th century BC to the 6th century AD.
It is conventionally taken to begin with the earliest-recorded Greek poetry of Homer (8th–7th century BC), and continues through the emergence of Christianity and the decline of the Roman Empire in the 5th to 6th centuries, the period during which Late Antiquity blends into the "Dark Ages" or Early Middle Ages.

The geographic scope of Classical Antiquity may be taken to extend to Central Asia and North India due to the far-reaching influence of Greek culture during the Hellenistic period (late 4th to 2nd centuries BC),
but the historiographies of other world regions have their own notion of "classicity" which do not fall within the scope of this list.

Africa

Europe

Central Asia

East Asia

South Asia

West Asia

See also

 List of Iron Age states 
 List of states during Late Antiquity  
 List of states during the Middle Ages 
 List of former sovereign states
List of states in the 6th century BC
List of states in the 5th century BC
List of states in the 4th century BC
List of states in the 3rd century BC
List of states in the 2nd century BC
List of states in the 1st century BC
List of states in the 1st century
List of states in the 2nd century
List of ancient great powers

References

External links 
 History Files
 Livius Ancient History Articles
 World History Maps (Individual) from 1300 BC to 1500 AD

Ancient history
List of states
Classical Antiquity